Le Ham may refer to the following places in France:

 Le Ham, Manche, a commune in the Manche department
 Le Ham, Mayenne, a commune in the Mayenne department